Bobonaro (or ) is a municipality (and was formerly a district) in the Democratic Republic of Timor-Leste commonly known as East Timor. It is the second-most western municipality on the east half of the island. It has a population of 92,045 (Census 2010) and an area of 1,376 km².

Etymology
The word Bobonaro is said to be a Portuguese approximation of the Tetum language word Buburnaru, which means 'tall eucalypt'. However, there are also other explanations for the origin of the municipality's name. 

Ho and nalu, the name of a traditional woven basket also called a 'bote' or a 'taan', are words in the local Bunak language. The basket is worn on the back with a strap on the forehead. In combination, ho and nalu mean 'basket of blood' or 'basket of life', and Bobonaro approximates the combination.

Additionally, the combination of the words bobo and naru in another local language, Kemak, refer to a safe place where one can hide for a long time.

Geography
The Savu Sea lies to the north of Bobonaro. The municipality borders the municipalities of Liquiçá to the northeast, Ermera to the east, Ainaro to the southeast, and Cova-Lima to the south. To the west lies the Indonesian province Nusa Tenggara Timur. In Portuguese Timor, the then district had the same boundaries as the present municipality; however its capital was at Vila Armindo Monteiro, which is now called Bobonaro.

The capital of Bobonaro is East Timor's fourth largest city, Maliana.  it had a population of 13,200. It sits at 9.00°S and 125.22°E, 149 km from to the southwest of the national capital, Dili. The next two largest cities in the municipality are Bobonaro City (also known as Aubá), with 6,700 people; and Lolotoi with a population of 3,800. Another village is Atabae in Atabae Administrative Post.

Administrative posts
The municipality's administrative posts (formerly sub-districts) are:
Atabae
Balibo
Bobonaro
Cailaco
Lolotoe (also spelled Lolotoi); and
Maliana.

The administrative posts are divided into 50 sucos ("villages") in total.

Infrastructure
The main road between Dili and the Indonesian border at Batugade runs through this municipality, clinging closely to the coast for almost its entire length through the municipality. It runs through Atabae and Balibó administrative posts.

Border crossings
The main border crossing between East Timor and Indonesia is located in this district at Batugade where the East Timor Immigration Post is located. The Indonesian checkpoint is located in Mota'ain in Belu Regency, Nusa Tenggara Timur Province. Another minor border crossing checkpoint is maintained by the Immigration Service of East Timor within this municipality at Tunibibi near Maliana. The Indonesian post for this crossing is at Turiskain, also in Belu Regency.

History
The municipality had been a popular destination in Timor, due to its mountains and hot springs, but it suffered much violence in the war for independence. Balibó, located about 10 miles from the Indonesian border, was estimated by Human Rights Watch to be 70% destroyed during the militia violence that preceded the referendum for East Timorese independence. It was also the site of the killing of five Australian-based journalists (the Balibo Five) by Indonesian forces on 16 October 1975 during an incursion by Indonesia into what was then Portuguese Timor.

Demographics
In addition to the official languages of Tetum and Portuguese, a large part of Bobonaro speaks the Malayo-Polynesian languages Bekais and Kemak and Papuan language Bunak, which are designated "national languages" by the constitution.

See also
Battle of Aidabasalala

References

Notes

Bibliography

External links

  – official site (in Tetum with some content in English)
  – information page on Ministry of State Administration site 

 
Municipalities of East Timor